The russet-crowned warbler (Myiothlypis coronata) is a species of bird in the family Parulidae.
It is found in Bolivia, Colombia, Ecuador, Peru, and Venezuela.
Its natural habitats are subtropical or tropical moist montane forests and heavily degraded former forest.

Taxonomy

The order Passeriformes is characterized by the habit of its individuals to stand and perch.  While the individuals are smaller than members of other orders, the order itself is one of the largest of all vertebrates.

The family Parulidae are the warblers of the New World.  They are largely arboreal and very colorful, and they are unrelated to the Old World warblers (Sylviidae), and the Australian warblers (Acanthizidae).

List of subspecies
Myiothlypis coronata castaneiceps 
Myiothlypis coronata chapmani
Myiothlypis coronata coronatus
Myiothlypis coronata elatus
Myiothlypis coronata inaequalis 
Myiothlypis coronata notius 
Myiothlypis coronata orientalis 
Myiothlypis coronata regulus

Description
The russet-crowned warbler is approximately 14 cm in length.  Among its distinguishing markings are the rust-orange crown, for which it is named, black crown-stripes and eye-line and otherwise gray face.  Its breast is often pale yellow.  The species exhibits no obvious sexual dimorphism.

Vocalization
It has a musical song typically delivered in a rapid phrase of rising pitch.  The response by the mate, often delivered immediately following or shortly after, is a similar song of descending pitch.

Distribution and habitat
Most populations occur between 1500 and 3000 meters above sea level on either side of the Andes throughout northern South America. Typically found in the subtropical and temperate forests, they can usually be found inhabiting dense under growth.

Diet
The russet-crowned warbler forages in pairs and small mixed flocks.

References

Ridgely, Robert S. & Greenfield, Paul J. (2001): The Birds of Ecuador: Field Guide. Cornell University Press, Ithaca, New York. 
Restall, Robin (2007): Birds of Northern South America: An Identification Guide. Yale University Press, New Haven and London. 

russet-crowned warbler
Birds of the Northern Andes
russet-crowned warbler
Taxonomy articles created by Polbot